The khong wong lek is a gong circle used in Thai classical music. It has 18 tuned bossed gongs, and is smaller and higher in pitch than the khong wong yai. Both instruments are played in the same manner, the khong wong lek plays a faster and more ornate variation on the principal melody, with less use of two-note chords.
Each gong is tuned with beeswax under it.

The khawng wong lek was created during the reign of King Rama III (1824-1854) by skilled musicians.

It is equivalent to the Cambodian Kong toch.

References

External links
Sound sample
Khong wong lek page

Thai musical instruments
Gongs